Frederick Bacon may refer to:
Fred Bacon, British runner
Frederick J. Bacon (1871–1948), American banjoist and banjo manufacturer
Frederick S. Bacon (1877–1961), American football coach
John Henry Frederick Bacon (1865–1914), British painter